Geographic center of Taiwan is the center point of Taiwan Island. It is located at    Hutoushan, "Tiger Head Mountain") in the township of Puli in Nantou County, Taiwan.

History
The first Geographic Center of Taiwan monument was constructed at the base of MountHutou in the 1970s. Following improved surveying, another monument was built later on, on the peak of the mountain. The peak monument was built on the former site of the Yoshitaka Shrine erected by the Japanese during their occupation of Taiwan.

Architecture
The monument is located on top of 400 stairs leading to it. The base monument features an inscription by former President Chiang Ching-kuo, written as Shan Qing Shui Xiu. There are concentric steel rings on top of the monument pole, forming the basis of Puli Township logo. The peak monument was built in an aboriginal style, using columns with flare tops.

Transportation
The monument is accessible by bus from Taichung Station of Taiwan Railways.

See also
 Geography of Taiwan
 Cape Fugui, the northernmost point on Taiwan
 Eluanbi, the southernmost point on Taiwan

References

Geography of Nantou County
Taiwan